Vandve or Vandved is an island in the municipality of Dønna in Nordland county, Norway. Vandve Church is located on the island. There is a regular ferry connection to the nearby island of Dønna. In 2017, there were about 30 residents of the island.

See also
List of islands of Norway

References

Dønna
Islands of Nordland